The Whole Shabang is a brand of seasoned snacks made by the Keefe Group, a company that specializes in serving the prison population. A spinoff of the Keefe Group's Moon Lodge potato chips, The Whole Shabang has garnered a cult following among former inmates as well as those who have never been incarcerated due to positive word-of-mouth, leading the company to sell them to the general public.

History
The Whole Shabang started off as a flavor of Moon Lodge potato chips, Keefe's private label brand of potato chips for prison commissary stores. The flavor is often described as a hybrid between salt & vinegar and barbecue potato chips sold in more mainstream retail channels, known in Canada as all-dressed. 

Initially, like most of Keefe's products outside of national name brands, The Whole Shabang was only sold in commissary stores. However, ex-inmates began looking for the product once released from prison but couldn't find it, leading to a grey market for The Whole Shabang through e-commerce sites such as eBay. Many others used social media to contact Keefe directly, asking them to offer the chips for sale to the general public. In 2012, Keefe acknowledged publicly that they had a major hit on their hands, but wouldn't offer The Whole Shabang for sale to the general public.

By 2016, however, demand from ex-inmatesincluding those who served as little as 60 days in a county jail as well as prison visitorsprompted Keefe to spin off The Whole Shabang from their Moon Lodge line and offer them online to the general public.

Flavors
Keefe offers The Whole Shabang in several flavors.

The Whole Shabang Original Potato Chips
The Whole Shabang Extreme Rippled Potato Chips
The Whole Shabang Extreme Kettle Cooked Potato Chips
The Whole Shabang Original Popcorn (Discontinued)
The Whole Shabang Extreme Crunchies
The Whole Shabang Original Peanuts

References

External links 
 Official website

Prison food
Potato dishes
Snack foods